The Ace of Cads is a 1926 American silent romantic drama film produced by Famous Players-Lasky and distributed by Paramount Pictures. It was directed by Luther Reed and starred Adolphe Menjou and Alice Joyce. The film is now considered lost. The film is an adaptation of a Michael Arlen story by the same name.

Cast
Adolphe Menjou - Chappel Maturin
Alice Joyce - Eleanour
Norman Trevor - Sir Guy de Gramercy
Philip Strange - Basil de Gramercy
Suzanne Fleming - Joan

References

External links

1926 films
1926 romantic drama films
American romantic drama films
American silent feature films
American black-and-white films
Famous Players-Lasky films
Films based on short fiction
Lost American films
Paramount Pictures films
1926 lost films
Lost romantic drama films
Films directed by Luther Reed
1920s American films
Silent romantic drama films
Silent American drama films
1920s English-language films
English-language romantic drama films